Gerald Christian (born August 26, 1991) is a former American football tight end. He was Mr. Irrelevant in 2015 when the Arizona Cardinals drafted him with the 256th pick in the 2015 NFL Draft. He played college football at Louisville. His brother, Geron Christian, played college football at Louisville as well, and plays for the Kansas City Chiefs.

Early years
Christian attended William T. Dwyer High School in Palm Beach Gardens, Florida.

College career
Christian played for the Florida Gators from 2010 to 2011 and  Louisville from 2012 to 2014. In his senior season in 2014, Christian caught 32 passes for 384 yards and five touchdowns. He was named third-team All-ACC.

Professional career

Arizona Cardinals
Christian was selected by the Arizona Cardinals with the final pick of the 7th round (256th overall pick) in the 2015 NFL Draft, making him Mr. Irrelevant. Cardinals teammate Chandler Harnish, who was Mr. Irrelevant in 2012, announced the pick. On September 3, 2015, in the Cardinals' final preseason game against the Denver Broncos, Christian tore the MCL in his left knee. He was placed on season-ending injured reserve the next day. He went to the Cardinals' training camp in 2016, but he was released on August 29, 2016.

Buffalo Bills
On September 7, 2016, Christian was signed to the Bills' practice squad. He was promoted to the active roster on October 4, 2016. He was released on October 21, 2016 and was re-signed to the practice squad on October 25. He was elevated back to the active roster on October 28, 2016. He was released by the Bills on November 26, 2016 and was re-signed to the practice squad. He was promoted back to the active roster on December 3, 2016. In the three games Christian was activated, he had one reception for 14 yards.

On March 6, 2017, Christian was released by the Bills.

Arizona Cardinals (second stint)
On July 27, 2017, shortly before the summer training camp, Christian was signed by the Cardinals. He was waived at the end of training camp on September 2, 2017.  This proved to be the end of Christian's NFL career.

Arizona Hotshots
In November 2018, Christian signed with the Atlanta Legends of the Alliance of American Football, before the league's first (and only) season in the late winter of 2019. He eventually joined the Arizona Hotshots instead. 

The league ceased operations in April 2019, 8 weeks into a scheduled 10-game regular season.  Christian played in all 8 of the Hotshots' games, making 14 catches for 158 yards and scoring 1 touchdown.

References

External links

1991 births
Living people
American football tight ends
Arizona Cardinals players
Arizona Hotshots players
Atlanta Legends players
Buffalo Bills players
Florida Gators football players
Louisville Cardinals football players
People from Palm Beach Gardens, Florida
Sportspeople from the Miami metropolitan area